The 2010 Superstars Series season was the seventh year of the Superstars Series, an Italian-based touring car racing series, and the fourth year of the International Superstars Series. The season began at Monza on March 28, and finished at Kyalami on November 28, after 10 rounds. The season was made up of two different drivers championships, the International Superstars Series and the Campionato Italiano Superstars, both achieved by Thomas Biagi driving for BMW.

Teams and drivers

Calendar

Scoring system

Results

Championship standings

Campionato Italiano Superstars

International Superstars Series

References

External links
Official Superstars website

Superstars Series
Superstars Series seasons